The Lijiang Sports Development Centre Stadium, or simply Lijiang Stadium, is a sports venue in Lijiang, Yunnan, PR China. It has a capacity of 22,400 and it is used mostly for association football matches. It is also used for athletics.

References

Football venues in China
Multi-purpose stadiums in China